Andrey Igorevich Akimov (in , born 22 September 1953 in Leningrad, Soviet Union) is the Chairman of the Management Board of Gazprombank (open joint-stock company). He is believed to be a former KGB agent and a member of the Russian Intelligence Community.

Early life and education
Akimov was born in Leningrad in 1953. He earned his degree from the Moscow Financial Institute in 1975, studying international economics, finance and banking.

Career

Vneshtorgbank
From 1974 to 1987, Andrey Akimov was employed in Vneshtorgbank at senior positions heading the financial operations department, which was involved with securities, of VTB USSR until 1985. From 1985 to 1987, he held a post, which is usually given to an undercover KGB agent, as Deputy Director General of the Vneshtorgbank branch in Zurich (Switzerland). From 1987 to 1990, he held a post, which is usually given to an undercover KGB agent, as the Director General of the Soviet-controlled Donau Bank in Vienna (Austria) at the same time Alexander Medvedev worked at Donau Bank.

IMAG GmbH
From January 1991 to November 2002, he was a Managing Director of the financial company IMAG GmbH in Vienna (Austria), which specialized in financing the oil and natural gas industry, and was regular advisor to the Chairman of the Management Board of Vneshtorgbank.

At IMAG, Akimov had a mandate from the Supreme Economic Council under the Presidium of the Supreme Council of the Russian Federation "in order to attract loans and investments in the Russian economy". Through IMAG, Akimov participated in the Russian privatization project including attracting investment from Bear Stearns for AvtoVAZ instead of the traditional Soviet Union supporter Fiat, investment from Kohlberg, Kravis, Roberts & Co (KKR) for KamAZ, and Bear Sterns for Tomskneft.

GPB
In November 2002, Akimov has taken up a post of the Chairman of the Management Board of the GPB (OJSC).

Krasny Okyabr
Following the bankruptcy of Krasny Oktyabr in 2009 in which the Andrei Borodin led Bank of Moscow was a large creditor, Akimov, as the interim manager of the plant, appointed the Ukrainian Dmitro Gerasimenko, who is the owner of Dieg-Impex LLC, to be executive director of Krasny Oktyabr and who in November 2018 "sold" the plant to Pavel Krotov.

Corporate boards
Since December 2006, Akimov is a member of the Novatek Board of Directors. Since June 2011, he is a member of the Gazprom Board of Directors. He is a member of the Supervisory Board of the CSKA ice hockey club.

Awards
Awarded the Order of Honor (2008), Order for Merit to the Fatherland, 4th Class (2013), and the Order of Alexander Nevsky (2017).

Sanctions
In April 2018, the United States imposed sanctions on him and 23 other Russian nationals during the War in Ukraine. Following Russia's 2022 invasion of Ukraine, Akimov was sanctioned by the UK.

Personal life
His romantic partner has been identified as the painter Marianna Chaykina in Russian media. She has a Cypriot passport. She is listed as a co-owner of some of Akimov's companies. She bought a $15.6 million flat in London through a shell company.

The Pandora Papers leaks revealed that Akimov owned at least eight shell companies over the period 2007–2018.

Notes

References

1953 births
Businesspeople from Saint Petersburg
Russian bankers
Soviet bankers
Gazprom people
Living people
Soviet businesspeople
Soviet expatriates in Switzerland
Soviet expatriates in Austria
Financial University under the Government of the Russian Federation alumni
Russian individuals subject to the U.S. Department of the Treasury sanctions